Western Sahara, formerly the Spanish colony of Spanish Sahara, is a disputed territory claimed by both the Kingdom of Morocco and the Popular Front for the Liberation of the Saguia el Hamra and Rio de Oro (Polisario Front), which is an independence movement based in Algeria. The Annexation of Western Sahara by Morocco took place in two stages, in 1976 and 1979, and is considered illegal under international law.

Western Sahara is listed by the United Nations (UN) as a non-decolonized territory and is thus included in the United Nations list of non-self-governing territories, which regards Spain as the de jure administering state. Under international law, Western Sahara is not a legal part of Morocco and it remains under the international laws of military occupation.

Background 
Since the Madrid Accords of 1975, a part of Western Sahara has been administered by Morocco as the Southern Provinces. Another section, the Liberated Territories, is administered by the Polisario Front as the Sahrawi Arab Democratic Republic (SADR). Mauritania administers the western half of the Ras Nouadhibou Peninsula. A UN-monitored cease-fire has been in effect since September 1991.

While no other country than the United States has ever recognized Morocco's unilateral annexation of Western Sahara, a number of countries have expressed their support for a future recognition of Moroccan sovereignty over the territory as an autonomous part of the Kingdom. There is, for instance, a de facto recognition of the Moroccan claim on the part of some countries such as the case of the United Kingdom. Although the UK Foreign and Commonwealth Office (FCO) treats the status of Western Sahara as 'undetermined', its lack of reference to its current effective partition, considering the existence of the Polisario-held areas, indicates an acceptance of Morocco as the administering power in the entire territory. Overall, the annexation has not garnered as much attention in the international community as many other disputed annexations (e.g. the Russian annexation of Crimea).

In order to resolve the sovereignty issue, the UN has attempted to hold a referendum through the United Nations Mission for the Referendum in Western Sahara (MINURSO), and is holding direct talks between the Kingdom of Morocco and the Polisario Front. The UN recognizes neither Moroccan nor SADR sovereignty over Western Sahara.

Moroccan settlers currently make up more than two thirds of the 500,000 inhabitants of Western Sahara. Under international law, Morocco's transfer of its own civilians into occupied territory is in direct violation of Article 49 of the Fourth Geneva Convention (cf. Israeli and Turkish settlers).

Positions of the main parties

Kingdom of Morocco

The official position of the Kingdom of Morocco since 1963 is that all of Western Sahara is an integral part of the kingdom. The Moroccan government refers to Western Sahara only as "Moroccan Sahara", the "Saharan provinces", or the "Southern Provinces".

According to the Moroccan government, in 1958 the Moroccan Army of Liberation fought Spanish colonizers and almost liberated what was then Spanish Sahara. The fathers of many of the Polisario leaders were among the veterans of the Moroccan Southern Army, for example the father of Polisario leader Mohammed Abdelaziz. Morocco is supported in this view by a number of former Polisario founders and leaders. The Polisario Front is considered by Morocco to be a Moroccan separatist movement, referring to the Moroccan origins of most of its founding members.

On 22 January 2020, Morocco's House of Representatives voted unanimously to add Western Sahara waters to the Moroccan maritime borders.

Polisario Front and the Sahrawi Arab Democratic Republic
The Polisario Front, mainly backed by Algeria, is described by itself and its supporters as a national liberation movement that opposes Moroccan control of Western Sahara, whilst it is considered by Morocco and supporters of Morocco's claims over the Western Sahara to be a separatist organization. It began as a movement of students who felt torn between the divergent Spanish and Moroccan influences on the country. The original goal of the Polisario, which was to end Spanish colonialism in the region, was achieved, but their neighbours, Morocco and Mauritania, seized sovereignty of the region, which the Polisario felt was entitled to self-determination and eventually independence. The Polisario engaged in guerrilla warfare with the Moroccan and Mauritanian forces. It evacuated the Sahrawi population to the Tindouf refugee camps due to Royal Moroccan Air Force bombing of the refugee camps on Sahrawi land with napalm and white phosphorus. The Polisario Front has called for the self-determination of the people of Western Sahara to be decided through a referendum. Although the SADR is not recognized as a state by the UN, the Polisario is considered a direct participant in the conflict and as the legitimate representative of the Sahrawi people, recognized by the United Nations since 1979.

The Polisario Front argues that Morocco's position is due to economical interests (fishing, phosphate mining, and the potential for oil reserves) and political reasons (stability of the king's position and the governing elite in Morocco, deployment of most of the Moroccan Army in Western Sahara instead of in Morocco). The Polisario Front proclaimed the Sahrawi Arab Democratic Republic in Bir Lehlou (Western Sahara), on 27 February 1976.

Mauritania
Claims on Western Sahara had proliferated since the 1960s, fuelled by Mauritanian President Moktar Ould Daddah. Before Mauritania signed the Madrid Accords and after the withdrawal of the last Spanish forces, in late 1975, the Mauritanian Army invaded the southern part of Western Sahara, while the Moroccan Army did the same in the north. In April 1976, Mauritania and Morocco partitioned the country into three parts, Mauritania getting the southern one, which was named Tiris al-Gharbiyya. Mauritania waged four years of war against Polisario guerrillas, conducting raids on Nouakchott, attacks on the Zouerate mine train and a coup d'état that deposed Ould Daddah. Mauritania finally withdrew in the summer of 1979, after signing the Algiers Agreement with the Polisario Front, recognizing the right of self-determination for the Sahrawi people, and renouncing any claims on Western Sahara. The Moroccan Army immediately took control of the former Mauritanian territory. Mauritania recognized the Sahrawi Arab Democratic Republic on 27 February 1984.

Algeria
Algeria has supported the independence of the whole of Western Sahara since 1975, when Spanish forces and settlers withdrew from the area. It is one of the few countries to do so in the Arab League. It has provided aid to the 'Polisario Front'. Algeria's role became indirect, through political and military support for the Polisario Front. Algeria recognized the Sahrawi Arab Democratic Republic on 6 March 1976. Its involvement in Western Sahara independence movement has interrupted the development of Algerian-Morocco diplomatic relations, which were restored in 1988.

United Nations

Western Sahara is on the United Nations list of non-self-governing territories. The UN has been involved since 1988 in trying to find a solution to the conflict through self-determination. In 1988, the Kingdom of Morocco and the Polisario Front agreed to settle the dispute through a referendum under the auspices of the UN that would allow the people of Western Sahara to choose between independence or integration with Morocco. In 1991, the parties agreed upon the Settlement Plan, contingent on the referendum being held the following year, but due to disputes over voter qualification, the vote was not held. In the following years, the UN argued for negotiations between Morocco and the Polisario Front to resolve the deadlock, culminating in the Manhasset negotiations in 2007–2008. As of 2020, the mandate for MINURSO has been extended 47 times and it maintains its presence in the country, but has yet to fulfill its mission by organizing a referendum.

Positions of other states

Some states are supportive of the "right of self-determination of the Sahrawi people", including the option of autonomy under Moroccan sovereignty. Some states have changed their opinion frequently or have given separate announcements of support for both Morocco and the Polisario Front/SADR (Egypt, Italy, Lesotho, Russia, Rwanda, Yemen, etc.).

Some of the states announcing support of the "right of self-determination" currently recognize the Sahrawi Arab Democratic Republic. Not all of the states that have terminated diplomatic relations with or withdrawn recognition of the SADR have announced their support for the Moroccan claims.

The overwhelming majority of United Nation member states have not announced any position.

States supporting Polisario and the SADR on Western Sahara

States supporting Morocco's autonomy proposal

Position of United Nations Security Council permanent members
France
France claims neutrality on the Western Sahara issue, despite its military involvement in the Western Sahara War on the side of Morocco and Mauritania (see Operation Lamantin). In 2009 and 2010, France used the threat of its veto power to block the establishment of Human Rights monitoring by the MINURSO in Western Sahara. France has been a major backer of the Moroccan autonomy proposal and in the EU negotiated the concession of the advanced status to Morocco.

United States

The Obama administration disassociated itself from the Moroccan autonomy plan in 2009, however, reversing the Bush-backed support of the Moroccan plan, and returning to a pre-Bush position, wherein the option of an independent Western Sahara is on the table again.
In April 2009, 229 members of the U.S. House of Representatives, a clear majority and more than 50 more than the number who signed the letter in 2007, called on President Obama to support Morocco's autonomy plan and to assist in drawing the conflict to a close. The signers included Democratic Majority Leader Steny Hoyer and Republican Minority Leader John Boehner. In addition to acknowledging that Western Sahara has become a recruiting post for radical Islamists, the letter affirmed that the conflict is "the single greatest obstacle impending the security and cooperation necessary to combat" terrorism in the Maghreb. The letter referenced UN Security Council Resolution 1813 (2008), and encouraged President Obama to follow the policy set by President Clinton and followed by President Bush. The congressmen expressed concerns about Western Sahara's viability. They referenced a UN fact-finding mission to Western Sahara which confirmed the State Department's view that the Polisario proposal, which ultimately stands for independence, would lead to a non-viable state. In closing, the letter stated, "We remain convinced that the U.S. position, favoring autonomy for Western Sahara under Moroccan sovereignty is the only feasible solution. We urge you to both sustain this longstanding policy, and to make clear, in both words and actions, that the United States will work to ensure that the UN process continues to support this framework as the only realistic compromise that can bring this unfortunate and longstanding conflict to an end."
Commenting on a 2004 free trade agreement with Morocco, US Trade Representative Robert Zoellick stated in a letter to Congressman Joe Pitts in response to his questioning, "the United States and many other countries do not recognize Moroccan sovereignty over Western Sahara and have consistently urged the parties to work with the United Nations to resolve the conflict by peaceful means. The Free Trade Agreement will not include Western Sahara."

In April 2013, the United States proposed that MINURSO monitored human rights (as all the other UN mission since 1991) in Western Sahara, a move that Morocco strongly opposed, cancelling the annual African Lion military exercises with U.S. Army troops. Also in mid-April, United States Ambassador to Morocco Samuel L. Kaplan declared during a conference in Casablanca that the Moroccan autonomy plan "can't be the only basis in these negotiations", referring to the UN sponsored talks between the Polisario Front and Morocco.

On 10 December 2020, President Donald Trump announced that the United States would officially recognize Morocco's claims over Western Sahara, as a result of Morocco agreeing to normalize relations with Israel.

States which have not announced any position
The following states and entities have not announced any position:
 Americas: Argentina, Bahamas, Chile
 Africa: Eritrea, Tunisia
 Europe: Andorra, Bulgaria, Belarus, Czech Republic, Monaco, San Marino, Liechtenstein, Vatican City, Malta, Luxembourg, Montenegro, Moldova, Lithuania, Latvia, Estonia, Georgia, Armenia, Switzerland
 Asia: People's Republic of China (UNSC-P5), Indonesia, Kazakhstan, Kyrgyzstan, Palestine, Tajikistan, Uzbekistan, Turkmenistan, Turkey, Pakistan, Nepal, Thailand, Singapore, Japan, Mongolia, Bhutan, Bangladesh, Brunei, Malaysia, Myanmar, Philippines
 Oceania: Australia, New Zealand, Tonga, Samoa, Niue, Palau, Micronesia, Marshall Islands
 Others: Abkhazia, Artsakh, Republic of China (Taiwan), Kosovo, Somaliland, Transnistria
 Sovereign Military Order of Malta

Positions of international organizations

The SADR is also a member of the Asian-African Strategic Partnership, formed at the 2005 Asian-African Conference, over Moroccan objections to SADR participation.

In 2006, the SADR participated in a conference of the Permanent Conference of Political Parties of the Latin American and the Caribbean.

African Union
On 22 February 1982, the SADR secured membership in the Organisation of African Unity.

In 1984, Morocco withdrew from the AU's predecessor, the Organization of African Unity (OAU), in protest of the group's recognition of the Sahrawi Arab Democratic Republic (SADR).

The African Union (formerly the OAU) has given the Sahrawi Arab Democratic Republic full recognition, and accepted it as a member state (which has led Morocco to leave the union.). Mohamed Abdelaziz, president of the SADR, has been vicepresident of the OUA in 1985, and of the AU in 2002.

In 2016, King Mohammed VI of Morocco declared his country's intention to become a member of the African union. On the same day, twenty eight African countries or about 52% of the 54 UN recognized member states of the African Union signed a petition to expel the Sahrawi Arab Democratic Republic from the African Union. At the same time, AU Commission Chairwoman Nkosazana Dlamini-Zuma reaffirmed the AU's support for Western Sahara's independence.

European Union
The European Union supports the right of self-determination of the Sahrawi people (the MINURSO UN-sponsored referendum), but does not recognize the Polisario Front. Over practical issues such as fishing in the EEZ the EU deals with Morocco as the country currently exercising "jurisdiction, but not sovereignty" over the Western Sahara territory. In addition, members of the EFTA trade bloc have made statements excluding the Western Sahara from the Moroccan-EFTA free trade agreement. In December 2016, the European Court of Justice reaffirmed in Council v Front populaire pour la libération de la saguia-el-hamra et du rio de oro (Front Polisario) that Morocco has no basis for sovereignty over Western Sahara and that trade deals with Morocco cannot apply to the occupied territory.

United Nations
Since 1966, the United Nations request for the celebration of a referendum for enabling the "indigenous population" to exercise freely their right to self-determination. Since 1979, the United Nations has recognized the Polisario Front as the representative of the people of Western Sahara, and considered Morocco as an occupying force.

Former United Nations Secretary-General Kofi Annan stressed, in his last report on Western Sahara, to the Security Council:

"The Security Council would not be able to invite parties to negotiate about Western Saharan autonomy under Moroccan sovereignty, for such wording would imply recognition of Moroccan sovereignty over Western Sahara, which was out of the question as long as no States Member of the United Nations had recognized that sovereignty".

See also

 Foreign relations of Morocco
 Foreign relations of the Sahrawi Arab Democratic Republic
 List of states with limited recognition
 Polisario Front

Notes

References

Bibliography
 Hodges, Tony. Western Sahara: Roots of a Desert War, Lawrence Hill & Company, 1983, p. 308
 Hodges, Tony, and Pazzanita, Anthony. Historical Dictionary of Western Sahara, 2 ed., Scarecrow Press, 1994, pp. 378–379.

External links

Tables of states recognizing the SADR
 World Statesmen
 Western Sahara On-line
 The SADR 
 Lasonet.com 
 Friends of the Sahara 
 The Association for a Free and Fair Referendum in Western Sahara

Western Sahara
Politics of the Sahrawi Arab Democratic Republic
Diplomatic recognition
Western Sahara conflict